5-MeO-NBpBrT (5-Methoxy-N-(4-bromobenzyl)tryptamine) is a  N-substituted member of the methoxytryptamine family of compounds. Like other such compounds it acts as an antagonist for the 5-HT2A receptor, with a claimed 100x selectivity over the closely related 5-HT2C receptor. While N-benzyl substitution of psychedelic phenethylamines often results in potent 5-HT2A agonists, it had been thought that N-benzyl tryptamines show much lower efficacy and are either very weak partial agonists or antagonists at 5-HT2A, though more recent research has shown stronger agonist activity for 3-substituted benzyl derivatives. Extending the benzyl group to a substituted phenethyl can also recover agonist activity in certain cases.

See also 
 25B-NBOMe
 25I-NBF
 RH-34

References 

5-HT2A antagonists
Tryptamines